Derbyshire County Cricket Club in 2004 was the cricket season when the English club Derbyshire had been playing for one hundred and thirty-four years.   In the County Championship, they finished eighth in the second division and in the National League, they finished ninth in the second division. They were knocked out in their first match in the Cheltenham and Gloucester Trophy.  They were eliminated at group level in the North section of the Twenty20 Cup.

2004 season

Derbyshire was in Division 2 of the County Championship and finished in eighth position. In addition to the Championship, they played Durham University and the touring West Indies. Of their eighteen first class games, they won two and lost seven, the remainder being drawn. Derbyshire was in Division 2 of the NatWest Pro40 League in which they won five of their eighteen matches to finish ninth in the division. In the Cheltenham and Gloucester Trophy, Derbyshire were eliminated in their first match which was in the second round. They also played a one-day match against the touring New Zealanders.  In the Twenty20 Cup, Derbyshire played in the North Division and won two matches.

Luke Sutton was captain.  Hassan Adnan was top scorer and Graeme Welch took most wickets.

Matches

First Class
{| class="wikitable" style="width:100%;"
|-
! style="background:#efefef;" colspan="6"| List of matches
|- style="background:#efefef;"
!No.
!Date
!V
!Result 
!Margin
!Notes
|-
|1
|16 Apr 2004   
 | Glamorgan   Sophia Gardens, Cardiff  
| style="background:#fc0;"|Drawn
 |  
|    Wallace 105; 
|- 
|2
|21 Apr 2004   
 | Somerset   County Ground, Taunton  
| style="background:#fc0;"|Drawn
 |  
|    Bowler 127; Hassan Adnan 107; KJ Dean 5-86; Laraman 5-58 
|- 
|3
|28 Apr 2004   
 | Durham   County Ground, Derby  
| style="background:#fc0;"|Drawn
 |  
|   CJL Rogers 156; North 119 
|- 
|4
|7 May 2004   
 | Hampshire   The Rose Bowl, Southampton  
| style="background:#fc0;"|Drawn
 |  
|    Kenway 101; Pothas 131; Mascarenhas 6-25
|- 
|5
|19 May 2004   
 | Somerset   County Ground, Derby  
| style="background:#fc0;"|Drawn
 |  
|    Blackwell 111; Caddick 6-92; Walker 5-68 
|- 
|6
|25 May 2004   
 | Glamorgan   County Ground, Derby  
| style="background:#f00;"|Lost 
 | 128 runs 
|    Hemp 102; G Welch 5-100
|- 
|7
|2 Jun 2004   
 | Leicestershire   Oakham School Ground  
| style="background:#f00;"|Lost 
 |  6 wickets
|    Hodge 221; G Welch 115; Cleary 7-80 
|- 
|8
|9 Jun 2004   
 | Durham University   County Ground, Derby  
| style="background:#0f0;"|Won 
 |  Innings and 5 runs
|    AG Botha 103 and 5-55; DBL Powell 6-49 
|- 
|9
|18 Jun 2004   
 | Nottinghamshire   Trent Bridge, Nottingham  
| style="background:#f00;"|Lost 
 |  10 wickets
|    Gallian 190; Pietersen 107; Read 130; Hassan Adnan 129; Shreck 6-103 
|- 
|10
|23 Jun 2004   
 | Essex   County Ground, Derby  
| style="background:#fc0;"|Drawn
 |  
|    LD Sutton 131; Napier 5-56 
|- 
|11
|21 Jul 2004   
 | Durham   Riverside Ground, Chester-le-Street  
| style="background:#0f0;"|Won 
 |  165 runs
|    J Moss 147; Davies 6-44 
|- 
|12
|28 Jul 2004   
 | Yorkshire   County Ground, Derby  
| style="background:#fc0;"|Drawn
 |  
|    CWG Bassano 100; McGrath 174 and 5-39 
|- 
|13
|5 Aug 2004   
 | West Indies  County Ground, Derby  
| style="background:#f00;"|Lost 
 |  315 runs
|    Baugh 150; NRC Dumelow 5-51; Edward 5-61 and 5-22
|- 
|14
|12 Aug 2004   
 | Yorkshire   Headingley, Leeds  
| style="background:#fc0;"|Drawn
 |  
|    Wood 123; McGrath 109; 
|- 
|15
|19 Aug 2004   
 | Nottinghamshire   County Ground, Derby  
| style="background:#f00;"|Lost 
 |  Innings and 56 runs
|    Hassan Adnan 140; CWG Bassano 123; Bicknell 175; Pietersen 153; G Welch  5-101; G Smith 5-35 
|- 
|16
|24 Aug 2004   
 | Leicestershire   County Ground, Derby  
| style="background:#fc0;"|Drawn
 |  
|    
|- 
|17
|9 Sep 2004   
 | Essex   County Ground, Chelmsford  
| style="background:#f00;"|Lost 
 |  8 wickets
|    Middlebrook 5-26
|- 
|18
|16 Sep 2004   
 | Hampshire   County Ground, Derby  
| style="background:#f00;"|Lost 
 |  91 runs
|    G Welch 5-57; Udal 6-79
|-

totesport League
{| class="wikitable" style="width:70%;"
|-
! style="background:#efefef;" colspan="6"| List of matches
|- style="background:#efefef;"
!No.
!Date
!V
!Result 
!Margin
!Notes
 |- 
|1
|25 Apr 2004   
 | Somerset   County Ground, Taunton  
| style="background:#f00;"|Lost 
 |  109 runs
|    
|- 
|2
|2 May 2004   
 | Durham   County Ground, Derby  
| style="background:#0f0;"|Won 
 |  6 wickets
|    
|- 
|3
|3 May 2004   
 | Leicestershire   Grace Road, Leicester  
| style="background:#f00;"|Lost 
 |  33 runs
|    
|- 
|4
|23 May 2004   
 | Somerset   County Ground, Derby  
| style="background:#f00;"|Lost 
 |  114 runs
|    Gazzard 157; Parsons 5-39 
|- 
|5
|31 May 2004   
 | Durham   Riverside Ground, Chester-le-Street  
| style="background:#f00;"|Lost 
 |  7 wickets
|    
|- 
|6
|6 Jun 2004   
 | Middlesex   County Ground, Derby  
| style="background:#f00;"|Lost 
 |  8 wickets
|    
|- 
|7
|8 Jun 2004   
 | Scotland   County Ground, Derby  
| style="background:#0f0;"|Won 
 |  28 runs
|    
|- 
|8
|27 Jun 2004   
 | Worcestershire   County Ground, Derby  
| style="background:#0f0;"|Won 
 |  18 runs
|    J Moss 104 
|- 
|9
|4 Jul 2004   
 | Nottinghamshire   Trent Bridge, Nottingham  
| style="background:#0f0;"|Won 
 |  9 wickets
|    CWG Bassano 100 
|- 
|10
|11 Jul 2004   
 | Middlesex   John Walker's Ground, Southgate  
| style="background:#f00;"|Lost 
 |  9 wickets
|    
|- 
|11
|18 Jul 2004   
 | Sussex   County Ground, Derby  
| style="background:#f00;"|Lost 
 |  10 runs
|    
|- 
|12
|1 Aug 2004   
 | Worcestershire   County Ground, New Road, Worcester  
| style="background:#f00;"|Lost 
 |  111 runs
|    
|- 
|13
|3 Aug 2004   
 | Leicestershire   County Ground, Derby  
| style="background:#fc0;"|No Result
 |  
|    
|- 
|14
|8 Aug 2004   
 | Sussex   County Ground, Hove  
| style="background:#f00;"|Lost 
 |  84 runs
|    
|- 
|15
|10 Aug 2004   
 | Yorkshire   Headingley, Leeds  
| style="background:#0f0;"|Won 
 |  29 runs
|    
|- 
|16
|18 Aug 2004   
 | Nottinghamshire   County Ground, Derby  
| style="background:#f00;"|Lost 
 |  24 runs
|    
|- 
|17
|29 Aug 2004   
 | Yorkshire   County Ground, Derby  
| style="background:#f00;"|Lost 
 |  5 wickets
|    
|- 
|18
|5 Sep 2004   
 | Scotland   Grange Cricket Club Ground, Raeburn Place, Edinburgh  
| style="background:#f00;"|Lost 
 |  8 wickets
|    
|-

Cheltenham and Gloucester Trophy 
{| class="wikitable" style="width:70%;"
|-
! style="background:#efefef;" colspan="6"| List of matches
|- style="background:#efefef;"
!No.
!Date
!V
!Result 
!Margin
!Notes
 |-
|2nd Rnd 
|5 May 2004   
 | Somerset   County Ground, Derby  
| style="background:#f00;"|Lost 
 |  14 runs
|    Cox 131; Francis 8-66 
|-

Other one day matches

Twenty20 Cup
{| class="wikitable" style="width:70%;"
|-
! style="background:#efefef;" colspan="6"| List of matches
|- style="background:#efefef;"
!No.
!Date
!V
!Result 
!Margin
!Notes
 |-
 |1
|2 Jul 2004   
 | Yorkshire   County Ground, Derby  
| style="background:#f00;"|Lost 
 |  1 wicket
|    
|- 
|2
|8 Jul 2004   
 | Lancashire   County Ground, Derby  
| style="background:#f00;"|Lost 
 |  5 wickets
|    
|- 
|3
|9 Jul 2004   
 | Nottinghamshire   Trent Bridge, Nottingham  
| style="background:#0f0;"|Won 
 |  9 runs
|    
|- 
|4
|13 Jul 2004   
 | Durham   Riverside Ground, Chester-le-Street  
| style="background:#0f0;"|Won 
 |  4 wickets
|    
|- 
|5
|15 Jul 2004   
 | Leicestershire   County Ground, Derby  
| Abandoned
 |  
|    
|-

Statistics

Competition batting averages

Competition bowling averages

Wicket Keeping
Luke Sutton 
County Championship 	Catches 30, Stumping 3 
PRO40 Catches 19, Stumping 1  
Cheltenham and Gloucester Catches  , Stumping   
Twenty20 Catches 4, Stumping 2   
Lee Goddard
County Championship 	Catches 5, Stumping 0

See also
Derbyshire County Cricket Club seasons
2004 English cricket season

References

2004 in English cricket
Derbyshire County Cricket Club seasons